The Irish Builder was a successful trade journal published in Dublin, Ireland, under various names. Names used by the journal were: The Dublin Builder, or Illustrated Irish Architectural, Engineering, Mechanics’ & Sanitary Journal (1859-1866); Irish Builder and Engineering Record (1867-1871); Irish Builder (1872-1899); Irish Builder and Technical Journal to 1979. Its first proprietor and editor was an architect named J.J. Lyons.

History and profile
The Irish Builder was started as a successor to the Dublin Builder in 1867. Historical copies of the Dublin Builder are available to search and view in digitised form at The British Newspaper Archive.

The Irish Builder appeared twice monthly and was originally priced at fourpence, reduced to threepence after 1866. Subjects dealt with included economic matters, city planning, ventilation and health issues, lists of contracts awarded, and announcements regarding new materials or interesting buildings. The magazine ceased publication in 1903.

List of The Dublin Builder editions available free online (1859-1866)
The Dublin Builder (1859) - v1
The Dublin Builder (1860) - v2
The Dublin Builder (1861) - v3
The Dublin Builder (1862) - v4
The Dublin Builder (1863) - v5
The Dublin Builder (1864) - v6
The Dublin Builder (1865) - v7
The Dublin Builder (1866) - v8

List of Irish Builder and Engineering Record editions available free online (1867-1871)
Irish Builder and Engineer (1867) - v9 (no link available)
Irish Builder and Engineer (1868) - v10 (no link available)
Irish Builder and Engineer (1869) - v11
Irish Builder and Engineer (1870) - v12
Irish Builder and Engineer (1871) - v13

List of Irish Builder editions available free online (1872-1899)
Irish Builder and Engineer (1872) - v14
Irish Builder and Engineer (1873) - v15
Irish Builder and Engineer (1874) - v16
Irish Builder and Engineer (1875) - v17
Irish Builder and Engineer (1876) - v18
Irish Builder and Engineer (1877) - v19
Irish Builder and Engineer (1878) - v20
Irish Builder and Engineer (1879) - v21
Irish Builder and Engineer (1880) - v22
Irish Builder and Engineer (1881) - v23
Irish Builder and Engineer (1882) - v24
Irish Builder and Engineer (1883) - v25
Irish Builder and Engineer (1884) - v26
Irish Builder and Engineer (1885) - v27
Irish Builder and Engineer (1886) - v28
Irish Builder and Engineer (1887) - v29
Irish Builder and Engineer (1888) - v30
Irish Builder and Engineer (1889) - v31
Irish Builder and Engineer (1890) - v32
Irish Builder and Engineer (1891) - v33
Irish Builder and Engineer (1892) - v34
Irish Builder and Engineer (1893) - v35
Irish Builder and Engineer (1894) - v36
Irish Builder and Engineer (1895) - v37
Irish Builder and Engineer (1896) - v38
Irish Builder and Engineer (1897) - v39
Irish Builder and Engineer (1898) - v40 (no link available)
Irish Builder and Engineer (1899) - v41

Irish Builder and Engineer (1901) - v43
Irish Builder and Engineer (1906) - v48
Irish Builder and Engineer (1907) - v49

References and sources

Notes

Sources

External links
 The Irish Builder – The National Library of Ireland

Defunct magazines published in Ireland
Mass media in Dublin (city)
Monthly magazines published in Ireland
Magazines established in 1867
Magazines published in Ireland
Magazines disestablished in 1903
1867 establishments in Ireland